Smock mill (Polish: wiatrak holenderski) is a smock mill in the town of Wolin in the Kamień County, West Pomeranian Voivodeship, Poland. It is located in the eastern part of the town near the commentary, at the Jaracza Street. It is registered as a object of cultural heritage.

Mill was built in 1850. It has 3 consignations and has circular base. Currently it acts as an industrial mill.

References 

Smock mills
Windmills in Poland
Tourist attractions in West Pomeranian Voivodeship
Objects of cultural heritage in Poland